Nuestra Señora de la Porteria Parish Church (also Our Lady of the Gate Parish Church), commonly known as Daraga Church, is a Roman Catholic Church in the municipality of Daraga, Albay, Philippines under the jurisdiction of the Roman Catholic Diocese of Legazpi. The church was built by the Franciscans in 1772 under the patronage of the Our Lady of the Gate. Certain church sections were declared as a National Cultural Treasure of the Philippines in 2007.

History 
Daraga was established as a settlement by people relocating from Cagsawa, who feared another eruption of the Mayon Volcano in that region. They requested permission from the Spanish government to establish a new community and church south of Cagsawa. Their request was granted by Governor-General Simon de Salazar through a communication to the Alcade-mayor of the province of Camarines, dated June 12, 1772.

The present church of Daraga was built under the Franciscan priests in 1773. Built at the time that Daraga was a visita of Cagsawa, the church was erected atop a hill in barangay Santa Maria overlooking the Mayon Volcano. When the Mayon Volcano erupted on February 1, 1814, the residents of Cagsawa transferred to Daraga after the destruction of their church. It was a common belief, however, that the church of Daraga was built after the eruption of Mayon and that it replaced the church of Cagsawa. The church was consecrated to Our Lady of the Gate in 1854.

The church was heavily damaged by joint American and Filipino military bombers during the Second World War in 1945, and was hastily renovated after the war using a mix of Renaissance Gothic and Mexican Baroque styles. The church was redesigned to follow the norms of the Vatican II council from 1971 to 1973. In 1991, the altar was returned to its original position. The church is still undergoing preservation and rehabilitation measures to prevent deterioration.

The National Historical Institute (now National Historical Commission of the Philippines) unveiled the church's historical marker on October 16, 2008. The National Museum of the Philippines listed the church's eastern and western façade, belfry, and baptistry as a National Cultural Treasure in 2007.

Features

Façade 

The church is known for its Churrigueresque architectural style in its façade, a fine example of Baroque architecture. The façade and its walls are made out of volcanic rocks, which are rich in the area. The current white façade is the result of a coating of lime for protection from deterioration.

It is one of the few churches in the country that has four spiral columns known as Solomonic columns or salomónicas. The four columns bear round medallions, each with carved images of the four Evangelists. Another characteristic of the façade, which is unique to the church, is the absence of either vertical columns or horizontal cornices. Engraved on the façade and the adjacent belfry are statues of saints, mostly Franciscans, and rare religious seals such as the coats of arms of the Franciscan order, the Pope's tiara with the keys, and the five wounds or stigmata of St. Francis which survived the Second World War.

The arch over the entrance has an inscription in Latin which reads, "Bene fundata est domus Domini supra firmam petram" (Well founded is the house of the Lord on firm rock). Symbols carved out of stones of the three theological virtues (hope, faith, charity) and the Eucharist are also engraved.

Belfry 
The octagonal belltower, located on the left side of the church, has carved images of the twelve apostles distributed in the base's six faces. The tower has four levels, each tapered upwards and topped with a dome and cross.

Rehabilitation 
Due to several repairs and renovations done on the church from the past years due to the absence of renovation plans, certain parts of the church have been altered and loss its significance. The façade has been plastered but the original stone work has been revealed through time. With the help of government agencies like the National Historical Commission of the Philippines and the National Commission for Culture and the Arts, the church is undergoing rehabilitation works to preserve the church's cultural and historical significance. The Provincial Government of Albay led by Governor Joey Salceda allotted ₱ 35 million for the rehabilitation of certain historical and cultural heritage sites in the province including the church of Daraga.

See also 
 Cagsawa Ruins

Notes

Bibliography

External links 

Roman Catholic churches in Albay
Roman Catholic churches completed in 1772
National Cultural Treasures of the Philippines
Spanish Colonial architecture in the Philippines
Baroque church buildings in the Philippines
18th-century Roman Catholic church buildings in the Philippines
Churches in the Roman Catholic Diocese of Legazpi